Chancery Lane is a London Underground station on the Central Line between Holborn and The City in Central London, England. It has entrances within both the London Borough of Camden and the City of London. It opened in 1900 and takes its name from the nearby Chancery Lane.

The station is located between St Paul's and Holborn stations, within fare zone 1.

It is located at the junction of High Holborn, Hatton Garden and Gray's Inn Road, with subway entrances giving access to the ticket office under the roadway. Chancery Lane is one of the few London Underground stations which have no associated buildings above ground.

History
The station was opened by the Central London Railway (CLR) on 30 July 1900. The current station entrance is not the original. Originally provided with four lifts between ground and platform levels, the station was rebuilt in the early 1930s to operate with escalators. It was not possible to construct the inclined escalator shaft between the platforms and the existing entrance, so a new sub-surface ticket hall was constructed below the road junction. The new station entrance came into use on 25 June 1934. The old entrance building became redundant and, in recognition of the location of the new entrance, the station was renamed Chancery Lane (Gray's Inn), although the suffix subsequently fell out of use.

When the CLR excavated the running tunnels it routed them to avoid passing under surface buildings in order to limit the risk to the buildings from vibration. At Chancery Lane, the eastbound tunnel runs above the westbound one.

It is one of eight Underground stations with a deep-level air-raid shelter underneath it; after World War II this was turned into Kingsway telephone exchange. Access to the shelter was via the original station building and lift shaft as well as subsidiary entrances in Furnival Street and Took's Court.

Accidents and incidents
On 25 January 2003, a 1992 Stock train derailed at Chancery Lane, injuring 32 passengers, after a motor became detached from the train. All services on the entire Central line and the Waterloo & City line (which used the same type of train) were suspended, as the trains had to be taken out of service whilst the cause of the failure was determined and appropriate modifications made to the trains.

Connections
London Buses routes 8, 17, 46 and 521 and night routes N8 and N25 serve the station.

Gallery

References

External links

 London Transport Museum Photographic Archive
 
 
 

Central line (London Underground) stations
London Underground Night Tube stations
Tube stations in the London Borough of Camden
Former Central London Railway stations
Railway stations in Great Britain opened in 1900
Disasters on the London Underground
Derailments in the United Kingdom